D.U.I. is an American reality television series featuring police officers. The show premiered on December 1, 2011 on TLC, and is a similar format to COPS, but focuses exclusively on suspects arrested for driving under the influence of alcohol or other drugs. However, unlike COPS, the show will also follow the suspects through the legal system, and will show the personal consequences of their decision to drink and drive for each individual. The first six episodes of the series aired in 2011, with the next six following in 2012.

The series was shot in Oklahoma in Pontotoc, Cleveland, Sequoyah, Tulsa and Oklahoma counties, and features local sheriff's deputies from those counties, as well as Oklahoma Highway Patrol troopers. The show's producers said that Oklahoma was chosen for a shooting location because the state has one of the fastest DUI turnarounds in court, as well as some of the strictest DUI laws in the United States.

Episode

See also
 Policing in the United States
 Crime in the United States

References

External links
 

2010s American crime television series
2010s American reality television series
2011 American television series debuts
2012 American television series endings
English-language television shows
TLC (TV network) original programming
Television shows set in Oklahoma
Television shows set in Tulsa, Oklahoma
Documentary television series about policing
Law enforcement in the United States